Attention Deficit Domination is the eighth studio album by American musician Hank Williams III, released on September 6, 2011 on Hank 3 Records, through Megaforce Records. It reached third position on the Billboards Heatseekers album chart on its first week. The album is dedicated to Layne Staley of Alice in Chains.

Track listing

Personnel 
 Hank Williams III – vocals, guitar, bass, keyboards, drums, production

References

Hank Williams III albums
2011 albums
Megaforce Records albums